Herbrand Arthur Russell, 11th Duke of Bedford,  (19 February 1858 – 27 August 1940) was an English politician and peer. He was the son of Francis Russell, 9th Duke of Bedford, and his wife Lady Elizabeth Sackville-West, daughter of George Sackville-West, 5th Earl De La Warr.

Family
He married Mary du Caurroy Tribe, on 30/31 January 1888 at Barrackpore, British Raj. She was appointed DBE and died in an aviation accident in 1937, three years before her husband. They had one child, Hastings William Sackville Russell, 12th Duke of Bedford (1888–1953).

Herbrand Russell took as his ward the illegitimate Anglo-Indian daughter of his older brother, George Russell, 10th Duke of Bedford. The daughter was known to have lived with the family until she was married and frequently visited them afterwards.

Military career
He was commissioned in the Grenadier Guards and made Colonel of the 3rd Battalion, Bedfordshire Regiment between 1897 and 1908. He fought in the Egyptian campaign in 1882 and in the First World War, where he was mentioned in dispatches.

Public duty

The Duke of Bedford held the office of Lord Lieutenant of Middlesex between 1898 and 1926, Mayor of Holborn in 1900, Aide-de-Camp to the Viceroy of India between 1885 and 1886, Military Aide-de-Camp between 1908 and 1920 to King Edward VII and King George V, and sometime Deputy Lieutenant of Bedfordshire.

He was President of the Zoological Society of London from 1899 to 1936, and was concerned with animal preservation throughout his life. According to Jane Goodall in her book Hope for Animals, the Duke was instrumental in saving the milu (or Père David's deer), which was already extinct by 1900 in its native China. He acquired the few remaining deer from European zoos and nurtured a herd of them at Woburn Abbey. He gifted Himalayan tahr to the New Zealand government in 1903; of the three males and three females, five survived the journey and were released near the Hermitage Hotel at Mount Cook Village. He sent a further shipment in 1909 of six males and two females. Himalayan tahr are near-threatened in their native India and Nepal, but are so numerous in New Zealand's Southern Alps that they are hunted recreationally. A statue of a Himalayan tahr was unveiled in May 2014 at Lake Pukaki and dedicated by Henrietta, Dowager Duchess of Bedford.

Bedford served as president of the Cremation Society of Great Britain from 1921 to his death in 1940. He had the original cremator from Woking Crematorium moved and fitted inside the Bedford Chapel, a new chapel at Golders Green Crematorium, where he was himself cremated. His ashes are buried in the 'Bedford Chapel' at St. Michael’s Church, Chenies.

Honours
The Duke of Bedford was invested as a Knight of Grace of the Order of St John (KGStJ), as a Fellow of the Society of Arts (FSA) on 14 March 1901, as Knight of the Order of the Garter (KG) on 30 May 1902, as Knight Commander of the Order of the British Empire (KBE) in 1919, and as a Fellow of the Royal Society (FRS) in 1908. He was made an honorary Freeman of Holborn in 1931.

He was made an Honorary Doctor of Law (LL.D.) by Edinburgh University in 1906.

His grandson Ian Russell, 13th Duke of Bedford describes him as follows: "A selfish, forbidding man, with a highly developed sense of public duty and ducal responsibility, he lived a cold, aloof existence, isolated from the outside world by a mass of servants, sycophants and an eleven-mile wall." In conjunction with his son Hastings Russell, 12th Duke of Bedford, he developed plans to protect the Bedford fortune from the British tax regime. However, he died too soon for these to come to fruition and the only result was to involve his grandson in enormous difficulties in obtaining access to the family properties.

Herbrand and Hastings Russell feature largely in the 13th Duke's memoir, A Silver-Plated Spoon (World Books, 1959).

Ancestry

References

 "Burke's Peerage and Baronetage"

Bibliography
 Jane Goodall, with Thane Maynard and Gail Hudson, Hope for Animals and Their World: How endangered species are being rescued from the brink, 2009, Grand Central Publishing

External links
 
 Herbrand Russell, 11th Duke of Bedford

Grenadier Guards officers
British Army personnel of the Anglo-Egyptian War
British Army personnel of World War I
Deputy Lieutenants of Bedfordshire
411
Russell, Herbrand Arthur
Fellows of the Zoological Society of London
Presidents of the Zoological Society of London
Knights Commander of the Order of the British Empire
Knights of Grace of the Order of St John
Garter Knights appointed by Edward VII
Lord-Lieutenants of Middlesex
1858 births
1940 deaths
Herbrand